Dalgety may refer to:
Dalgety, New South Wales, a town in the Monaro Region of New South Wales, Australia
Dalgety Bay, a town in Fife, Scotland
Dalgety plc, a former Australian pastoral company and British trading company
Dalgety Offices, Townsville, a heritage-listed building built by Dalgety and Company in Queensland, Australia